Into the Blue 2: The Reef is an American action-thriller direct-to-video film, and a sequel to the 2005 film Into the Blue. None of the cast from the first film return, so the sequel only shares similar themes and situations to the original Into the Blue. It was directed by Stephen Herek, and was released on DVD in North America on April 21, 2009.

Plot
In Honolulu, Hawaii, a man dumps large containers into the ocean and then goes to meet with a few men in suits expecting to get paid. But because he dumped the containers and altered the schedule of those container shipments to the customer, he is killed.

We are then taken underwater in the blue ocean as Sebastian (Chris Carmack) and his girlfriend Dani (Laura Vandervoort) are dive surfing with a model. We learn that the group own a snorkeling business that rents out equipment for clients. Sebastian does not want to do this line of work forever.

For Sebastian, there are countless treasures in the ocean that he has been in search of for a long time but one that he has been searching for four years is the Spanish ship San Cristobal, which sank somewhere near the North Reef and is rumored to have sunk in the ocean with a large treasure.

Sebastian believes that if he finds this treasure, this will give him and his girlfriend the opportunity to live a better life.

Sebastian hangs out with his friend and employee Mace (Michael Graziadei) and his girlfriend Kimi (Mircea Monroe), Dani's best friend, who are a couple that have a difficult relationship because Mace tends to get involved with other women. While Mace and Kimi have a crazy relationship, Sebastian and Dani are very much in love.

While at work, they are visited by Carlton (David Anders) and Azra (Marsha Thomason), a couple who wants to hire them for diving in the North Reef for a week because they are looking for the San Cristobal.

Of course, Sebastian has been trying for several years to find it but Carlton happens to have a map which may lead them to the treasure. So, both Sebastian and Dani agree to help the couple. The four go on various diving expeditions to find the treasure.

We then get to see some of the beach life as all six individuals enjoy the beach. Dani, Kimi, Sebastian, and Mace get involved in separate beach volleyball competitions. Sebastian and Mace go against their main diving competitors, Avery (Rand Holdren), who dates a girl named Kelsey (Audrina Patridge), who loves to lecture him when he gets into trouble by messing around with women.

While at a club, another customer hits on the women and grabs the arm of Azra, who quickly puts him in a headlock. This raises the first red flag for Dani, who becomes suspicious.

The following day, we learn that Carlton is not really looking for the San Cristobal. He actually helps big clients smuggle treasure to other locations. Both Carlton and Azra tell Sebastian and Dani that if they help them find the two containers, they will earn $500,000. Also, we learn that if Carlton does not find the containers in a week, the men will kill them. The reason why he is willing to pay them a lot of money is part of an apology because the men who hired him know the names of Sebastian and Dani and their lives are in danger too.

So, now both Sebastian and Dani are forced to help Carlton and Azra find the two containers but while they are at sea, Avery takes notice and he starts looking to find whatever they are looking for.

With their lives threatened, Dani convinces Sebastian that they must look to see what is in those containers and why their lives are being threatened. Something terrible could be in those containers and they need to check them without bringing Carlton and Azra along.

Thus, the two take their boat out to sea late at night to dive and see what those containers are. What they find in the containers is not a treasure but a bomb. When they return from their boat after the dive, they are greeted by Carlton and Azra, who have been hiding in their boat and are ready to kill them. Carlton tells them that in container one there is the casing and in container two there is a nuclear warhead. One without the other is useless but together they make a powerful weapon. Their goal is to create a second Pearl Harbor.

Dani jumps off the boat to try to get help. She is found in the morning one mile off shore and is put in the hospital. At the same time, Azra and Carlton kidnap Mace and Kimi from their apartment and bring them back to the boat. They spend the night bound and gagged with Sebastian, and the next morning Carlton threatens to kill Kimi if Mace and Sebastian fail to retrieve the containers from the bottom of the sea. Azra tries to kill Dani in her hospital room, but she runs away and a chase ensues. Meanwhile, Sebastian and Mace try to bring up the containers for Carlton. Mace purposely messes up and Kimi is killed. Sebastian and Mace rebel, ending in Carlton and his bodyguard dead. Dani outruns Azra and Azra kills her boss so she can disappear again. Dani, Sebastian, and Mace reunite. They then have Kimi's funeral.

Six months later, Sebastian and Mace find the San Cristobal and buy their someday boat.

Cast
 Chris Carmack as Sebastian
 Laura Vandervoort as Dani
 Marsha Thomason as Azra 
 Michael Graziadei as Mace
 Mircea Monroe as Kimi
 Audrina Patridge as Kelsey
 Amanda Kimmel as Amanda
 Parvati Shallow as Parvati
 Rand Holdren as Avery
 David Anders as Carlton
 Mark Kubr as Milos
 Timothy Lechner as Detective Yorkin

Production
Into the Blue 2 was Audrina Patridge's first film role. It was to be directed and produced by Charles Winkler, with Hudson Hickman, Craig Roessler and Sarah Berrisford as the executive producers. 

It was filmed in O'ahu, Hawaii, United States from May to June 2008. Editing was carried out from September 2 until November 13, 2008.

Release
On November 19, 2008, it was announced that it would be released direct-to-DVD in spring 2009 despite previous plans for a 2010 theatrical release. The DVD artwork was released on December 3, 2008; the trailer following on January 20, 2009. It was released on DVD in the United States and Canada on April 21, 2009.

It was released in cinemas in the United Kingdom on August 2, 2009. According to TMZ.com, the film got a theatrical release in Brazil, Australia, Spain, Germany and Italy in summer/autumn 2009. The movie was released direct-to-DVD in Australia on February 10, 2010.

References

External links

 

2009 films
Films directed by Stephen Herek
Direct-to-video sequel films
Underwater action films
Metro-Goldwyn-Mayer direct-to-video films
Treasure hunt films
2000s English-language films
American direct-to-video films
American action thriller films
2000s American films